Domenicus Badiaz (fl. 1607) was a Danish architect probably of Italian origin in Renaissance Denmark. His name can be attached to various castles in Denmark including Lykkesholm Castle and Nyborg Castle (1607).

See also
List of Danish architects

References

Danish architects
17th-century Danish people
Danish people of Italian descent